Africa's Elephant Kingdom is a 1998 IMAX film documenting life under the lives of African elephants. The film was produced by Discovery Channel. The film is set in Tanzania and Kenya, and is narrated by an elephant named "Old Bull" (voiced by Avery Brooks). The film was directed by Michael Caulfield.

References

1998 films
1998 documentary films
IMAX short films
Films set in Kenya
Films set in Tanzania
1990s short documentary films
Films shot in Kenya
Films shot in Tanzania

IMAX documentary films
Films directed by Michael Caulfield